The 2016 Saudi Arabian snowstorm was an extreme weather event in late November 2016, in which parts of the Arabian Desert in Saudi Arabia experienced subzero temperatures, snowfall and flooding. 

Snow was first reported in northern parts of Saudi Arabia on 23 November. Normal seasonal temperatures do not fall below . Many Saudis enjoyed unusual outdoor activities such as building snowmen and sliding; however, the snow was followed by rain and lightning that caused flooding and led to the deaths of at least 7 people.

, snow had also fallen in Israel, Syria and other parts of the Middle East.

Snow has occasionally occurred in Saudi Arabia in previous winters. In 2013 a video of a man somersaulting in snow there circulated on social media. In January 2016, snow fell between Mecca and Medina for the first time in 85 years.

References 

2016 in Saudi Arabia
2016 meteorology
Environment of Saudi Arabia
November 2016 events in Asia